The 2010 División Profesional season (officially the 2010 Copa TIGO- Visión Banco for sponsorship reasons) was the 76th season of top-flight professional football in Paraguay. It was the third season in which a champion was crowned for each tournament.

Teams

Torneo Apertura
The Campeonato de Apertura, also the Torneo TIGO Apertura for sponsorship reasons, is the first championship of the season. It began on January 30 and ended on May 30.

Standings

Results

Top goalscorers
Source:

Torneo Clausura
The Campeonato de Clausura, also the Torneo Tigo Clausura for sponsorship reasons, is the second championship of the season. It began on July 16 and ended December 12.

Standings

Results

Top goalscorers
Source:

International qualification
The two tournament champions earn the Paraguay 1 and Paraguay 2 berths in the Second Stage of the 2011 Copa Libertadores. All remaining international qualification will be determined through a season-wide aggregate table. The Paraguay 3 in the 2011 Copa Libertadores berth goes to the best-placed non-champion. For the 2011 Copa Sudamericana, the Paraguay 1 berth goes to the highest placed champion. Paraguay 2 and Paraguay 3 will go to the highest placed teams who have not qualified to an international tournament.

Relegation
Relegations is determined at the end of the season by computing an average of the number of points earned per game over the past three seasons. The two teams with the lowest average is relegated to the División Intermedia for the following season.

See also
2010 in Paraguayan football

References

External links
APF's official website 
Season rules 
2010 season on RSSSF

Para
Paraguayan Primera División seasons
1